"Think About You" is a song by Norwegian DJ Kygo featuring American singer Valerie Broussard. It was released as a single on 14 February 2019, and considered timed for Valentine's Day.

Promotion
Kygo initially posted a teaser of the song on 11 February; Billboard described the clip as a visually "glitchy" teaser with the song's "melodic guitar line" heard through a "roaring wind". Kygo later shared the cover art and the release date. Your EDM felt it would be a song "typical of [Kygo's] core sound".

Music video
The music video was directed by Sarah Bahbah and released on February 22, 2019. It features a couple. Dylan Sprouse as Jax and Khadijha Red Thunder as Ariel, who have broken up recently, through the lens of a silent film about their relationship. Rob Raco also guest stars in the music video.

Charts

Weekly charts

Year-end charts

Certifications

References

2019 singles
2019 songs
Kygo songs
Song recordings produced by Kygo
Songs written by Kygo
Songs written by Valerie Broussard
Valerie Broussard songs